Strobilopteridae is an extinct family of eurypterids that lived in the Silurian and Devonian periods. The family is one of three families contained in the superfamily Eurypteroidea (along with Dolichopteridae and Eurypteridae), which in turn is one of the superfamilies classified as part of the suborder Eurypterina. The family contains two genera, Buffalopterus and Strobilopterus.

Strobilopterids were eurypterines with semicircular carapaces, a short appendage VI that barely projected from beneath the carapace, ornamentation on the carapace radiating from the lateral eyes and curving around the margins of the carapace and a row of angular scales across the posterior of the tergites on the metasoma.

See also 
 List of eurypterids

References 

Eurypteroidea
Devonian animals
Silurian animals
Prehistoric arthropod families